Marketing Science is a bimonthly peer-reviewed academic journal published by the Institute for Operations Research and the Management Sciences. It covers operations research and mathematical modeling to analyze marketing. According to the Journal Citation Reports, the journal has a 2017 impact factor of 2.794.

References

External links

Marketing journals
English-language journals
Bimonthly journals
INFORMS academic journals
Publications established in 1989